Sheykh Ahmad (also Romanized as Sheykh Aḩmad and Shaikh Ahmad; also known as Sheykh Aḩmadlū and Shikhakhmety) is a village in Azghan Rural District, in the Central District of Ahar County, East Azerbaijan Province, Iran. At the 2006 census, its population was 52, in 10 families.

References 

Populated places in Ahar County